The following television stations operate on virtual channel 23 in the United States:

 K05MW-D in Ferndale, Montana
 K07EN-D in Woods Bay/Lakeside, Montana
 K09YT-D in Sula, Montana
 K14LF-D in Willmar, Minnesota
 K14LT-D in Polson, Montana
 K15IY-D in Heron, Montana
 K15KF-D in Coos Bay, Oregon
 K16NF-D in Hot Springs, Montana
 K19GD-D in Kalispell & Lakeside, Montana
 K20CN-D in Fortuna/Rio Dell, California
 K20NF-D in Seattle, Washington
 K21DG-D in St. James, Minnesota
 K21MW-D in Thompson Falls, Montana
 K21OO-D in South Eureka/Loleta, California
 K22MT-D in Idabel, Oklahoma
 K23CU-D in Prineville, Oregon
 K23FH-D in Milton-Freewater, Oregon
 K23FY-D in Frost, Minnesota
 K23GF-D in Dove Creek, etc., Colorado
 K23KO-D in Rural Beaver County, Utah
 K23LB-D in Fargo, North Dakota
 K23LE-D in Sedalia, Missouri
 K23MQ-D in Duluth, Minnesota
 K23NB-D in York, Nebraska
 K23PA-D in Klamath Falls, Oregon
 K26CL-D in Alexandria, Minnesota
 K28OD-D in Powers, Oregon
 K28OI-D in Jackson, Minnesota
 K29OH-D in Victoria, Texas
 K30KY-D in Philipsburg, Montana
 K31PD-D in Whitefish, etc., Montana
 K32GX-D in St. James, Minnesota
 K32IG-D in Ellensburg, etc., Washington
 K35JT-D in Drummond, Montana
 K36KR-D in Elmo/Big Arm, Montana
 K36PM-D in Salmon, Idaho
 KAEF-TV in Arcata, California
 KAGS-LD in Bryan, Texas
 KAHO-LD in Woodville, Texas
 KBSI in Cape Girardeau, Missouri
 KBSV in Ceres, California
 KBTU-LD in Salt Lake City, Utah
 KCSD-TV in Sioux Falls, South Dakota
 KCWI-TV in Ames, Iowa
 KDDC-LD in Dodge City, Kansas
 KDEO-LD in Denver, Colorado
 KDGL-LD in Sublette, Kansas
 KDGU-LD in Ulysses, Kansas
 KEOO-LD in Midland, Texas
 KERO-TV in Bakersfield, California
 KEVN-LD in Rapid City, South Dakota
 KEVU-CD in Eugene, Oregon
 KEZT-CD in Sacramento, California
 KGCE-LD in Garden City, Kansas
 KHCE-TV in San Antonio, Texas
 KLMB-CD in El Dorado, Arkansas
 KLVD-LD in Las Vegas, Nevada
 KMCB in Coos Bay, Oregon
 KMUV-LD in Monterey, California
 KNAT-TV in Albuquerque, New Mexico
 KNDO in Yakima, Washington
 KOKI-TV in Tulsa, Oklahoma
 KQDA-LD in Denison, Texas
 KQEG-CA in La Crescent, Minnesota
 KRDT-CD in Redding, California
 KRPE-LD in San Diego, California
 KSWE-LD in Liberal, Kansas
 KTMF in Missoula, Montana
 KUVN-DT in Garland, Texas
 KVEO-TV in Brownsville, Texas
 W23BV-D in Evansville, Indiana
 W23BW-D in Madison, Wisconsin
 W23EB-D in Cadillac, Michigan
 W32FB-D in Ceiba, Puerto Rico
 W23FH-D in Erie, Pennsylvania
 W23FI-D in Valdosta, Georgia
 W23FJ-D in Jennings, Florida
 W23FL-D in Traverse City, Michigan
 W31FE-D in Savannah, Georgia
 WAAU-LD in Augusta, Georgia
 WATM-TV in Altoona, Pennsylvania
 WAUA-LD in Columbus, Georgia
 WBUI in Decatur, Illinois
 WCVE-TV in Richmond, Virginia
 WCVI-TV in Christiansted, U.S. Virgin Islands
 WDDN-LD in Washington, D.C.
 WDMY-LD in Toledo, Ohio
 WDVB-CD in Edison, New Jersey
 WDWA-LD in Damascus, Virginia
 WELF-TV in Dalton, Georgia
 WGGD-LD in Gainesville, Georgia
 WHMC in Conway, South Carolina
 WHPM-LD in Hattiesburg, Mississippi
 WIFR-LD in Rockford, Illinois
 WITD-CD in Chesapeake, Virginia
 WJDG-LD in Grundy, Virginia
 WJVF-LD in Jacksonville, Florida
 WKAR-TV in East Lansing, Michigan
 WKZT-TV in Elizabethtown, Kentucky
 WLTV-DT in Miami, Florida
 WMAO-TV in Greenwood, Mississippi
 WMDV-LD in Danville, Virginia
 WNDY-TV in Marion, Indiana
 WNJS in Camden, New Jersey
 WNLO in Buffalo, New York
 WPFO in Waterville, Maine
 WPVS-LD in Milwaukee, Wisconsin
 WQMC-LD in Columbus, Ohio
 WRGX-LD in Dothan, Alabama
 WSRE in Pensacola, Florida
 WTWV in Memphis, Tennessee
 WUCW in Minneapolis, Minnesota
 WUDT-LD in Detroit, Michigan
 WVPX-TV in Akron, Ohio
 WVUA in Tuscaloosa, Alabama
 WWJX in Jackson, Mississippi
 WWME-CD in Chicago, Illinois
 WXWZ-LD in Guayama, Puerto Rico
 WXXA-TV in Albany, New York

The following stations, which are no longer licensed, formerly operated on virtual channel 23:
 K45DS-D in Freshwater, etc., California
 KHMM-CD in Hanford, California
 WIEK-LD in Midland, Michigan
 WIFR in Freeport, Illinois
 WQDU-LD in Albany, Georgia
 WUEB-LD in Rockford, Illinois
 WUOF-LD in Gainesville, Florida

References

23 virtual